Mirabamides are sea sponge isolates that inhibit HIV-1 fusion.

References

Depsipeptides